Shang-Chi and the Legend of the Ten Rings is a 2021 American superhero film based on Marvel Comics featuring the character Shang-Chi. Produced by Marvel Studios and distributed by Walt Disney Studios Motion Pictures, it is the 25th film in the Marvel Cinematic Universe (MCU). The film was directed by Destin Daniel Cretton, from a screenplay he wrote with Dave Callaham and Andrew Lanham, and stars Simu Liu as Shang-Chi alongside Awkwafina, Meng'er Zhang, Fala Chen, Florian Munteanu, Benedict Wong, Yuen Wah, Michelle Yeoh, Ben Kingsley, and Tony Leung. In the film, Shang-Chi is forced to confront his past when his father Wenwu (Leung), the leader of the Ten Rings organization, draws Shang-Chi and his sister Xialing (Zhang) into a search for a mythical village.

A film based on Shang-Chi entered development in 2001, but work did not begin in earnest until December 2018 when Callaham was hired. Cretton joined in March 2019, with the project fast-tracked as Marvel's first film with an Asian lead. The film's title and primary cast were announced that July, revealing the film's connection to the Ten Rings organization, which previously appeared throughout the MCU, and its leader Wenwu. Shang-Chi and the Legend of the Ten Rings is the first Marvel Studios film with an Asian director and a predominantly Asian cast. Filming began in Sydney in February 2020 but was put on hold in March due to the COVID-19 pandemic. Production resumed in August before completing in October, with additional shooting occurring in San Francisco.

Shang-Chi and the Legend of the Ten Rings premiered in Los Angeles on August 16, 2021, and was released in the United States on September 3, as part of Phase Four of the MCU. It grossed over $432 million worldwide, making it the ninth-highest-grossing film of 2021. It set several box office records and received positive reviews from critics, many of whom praised the choreography of the action sequences, exploration and representation of Asian culture, Cretton's direction, and the performances from the cast, particularly those of Liu and Leung. The film received numerous awards and nominations, including a nomination for Best Visual Effects at the 94th Academy Awards. A sequel is in development, with Cretton set to return as writer and director.

Plot 

Around a thousand years ago, Xu Wenwu discovers the mystical ten rings which grant godly powers including immortality. He establishes the Ten Rings organization, conquering kingdoms and toppling governments throughout history. In 1996, Wenwu searches for Ta Lo, a village said to harbor mythical beasts. He travels through a magical forest to the village entrance but is stopped by a guardian, Ying Li. The two fall in love, and when the Ta Lo villagers reject Wenwu, Li chooses to leave with him. They marry and have two children, Shang-Chi and Xialing. Wenwu abandons his organization and locks away the ten rings.

When Shang-Chi is seven years old, Li is murdered by Wenwu's enemies, the Iron Gang. Wenwu dons the ten rings once again, massacres the Iron Gang, and resumes leadership of his organization. He makes Shang-Chi undergo brutal training in martial arts but does not allow Xialing to train with the others, prompting her to secretly teach herself. When Shang-Chi is 14, Wenwu sends him to assassinate the Iron Gang's leader. After completing his mission, a traumatized Shang-Chi runs away to San Francisco and adopts the name "Shaun".

In the present day, Shang-Chi works as a parking valet with his best friend Katy, who does not know about his past. They are attacked on a bus by the Ten Rings organization, who steal a pendant that Li gave to Shang-Chi. Shang-Chi travels to Macau to find his sister, fearing that the Ten Rings will go after her matching pendant. He reveals his past to Katy, who insists on helping him. They find Xialing at a secret fight club, which she founded after escaping from Wenwu at sixteen. The Ten Rings attack the fight club, and Wenwu arrives to capture Shang-Chi, Katy, Xialing, and her pendant.

They are taken to the Ten Rings' compound, where Wenwu uses the pendants to reveal a mystical map leading to Ta Lo. Wenwu explains that he has heard Li calling and believes she has been held captive in Ta Lo behind a sealed gate. He plans to destroy the village unless they release her. When his children and Katy object, he imprisons them. The three meet former actor Trevor Slattery, whom the Ten Rings imprisoned for impersonating Wenwu, and his hundun companion Morris, who offers to guide them to Ta Lo.

The group escapes and goes to Ta Lo, which exists in a separate dimension with various Chinese mythological creatures. They meet Ying Nan, Li's sister, who explains the history of Ta Lo: thousands of years ago, the universe containing the village was attacked by the soul-consuming Dweller-in-Darkness and its soul eaters, but was saved by a Chinese dragon called the Great Protector who helped seal the Dark Gate to the Dweller's world. According to Nan, the Dweller-in-Darkness has been impersonating Li so that Wenwu will use the ten rings to open the Gate. Shang-Chi, Xialing, Katy, Slattery, and Morris join the villagers in training and preparing for Wenwu's arrival, using outfits and weapons crafted from dragon scales.

Wenwu and the Ten Rings arrive and attack. Wenwu overpowers Shang-Chi, pushes him into the nearby lake, and attacks the Gate with the rings. This allows some of the Dweller's soul eaters to escape, and the Ten Rings join forces with the villagers to fight them. The Great Protector revives Shang-Chi and bears him from the lake to battle the soul eaters. Wenwu and Shang-Chi fight once more, and Shang-Chi gains the upper hand but chooses to spare Wenwu. The Dweller-in-Darkness escapes from the weakened Gate and attacks Shang-Chi. Wenwu saves Shang-Chi, bequeathing him the rings before the Dweller-in-Darkness kills him. Shang-Chi, the Great Protector, Xialing, and Katy slay the Dweller-in-Darkness. Afterward, Shang-Chi and Katy return to San Francisco, where the sorcerer Wong summons them to Kamar-Taj.

In a mid-credits scene, Wong introduces Shang-Chi and Katy to Bruce Banner and Carol Danvers while researching the rings' origin. They discover that the rings are acting as a beacon to something. In a post-credits scene, Xialing becomes the new leader of the Ten Rings, training women alongside men, despite having told Shang-Chi that she would disband the organization.

Cast 

 Simu Liu as Xu Shang-Chi / Shaun:A skilled martial artist who was trained at a young age to be an assassin by his father Wenwu. Shang-Chi left the Ten Rings organization for a normal life in San Francisco, and changed his name to "Shaun". Director Destin Daniel Cretton characterized Shang-Chi as a fish out of water in the U.S. who attempts to hide that with his charisma, and does not know "who he really is". Cretton also compared Shang-Chi to Matt Damon's character Will Hunting from Good Will Hunting (1997), with both characters combining masculinity and vulnerability, and having secrets and superpowers that they do not understand. Cretton described the film as a journey for Shang-Chi to discover his place in the world, and Liu added that Shang-Chi's identity struggles are the core of the character rather than his martial arts skills. Liu was knowledgeable in taekwondo, gymnastics, and Wing Chun, and learned and trained in tai chi, wushu, Muay Thai, silat, Krav Maga, jiu-jitsu, boxing, and street fighting for the film. Jayden Zhang and Arnold Sun portray Shang-Chi as a child and teenager, respectively.
 Awkwafina as Katy:A hotel valet and Shang-Chi's best friend in San Francisco who is unaware of his past. Awkwafina described Katy as relatable, with a "real heart" and dedication to Shang-Chi, who is "thrust into a world where she doesn't really know what to do [... and is] discovering things about herself". Katy has difficulty committing to a direction in her life, something Awkwafina felt was relatable struggle for a lot of Asian Americans due to their own expectations as well as those of their parents and society.
 Meng'er Zhang as Xu Xialing:Shang-Chi's estranged younger sister and Wenwu's daughter. Xialing is Zhang's first film role, and an amalgamation of several comics characters, particularly inspired by Zheng Bao Yu. Zhang said Xialing was vulnerable behind her tough exterior, and asked for a red streak that was originally in the character's hair to be removed after discovering the style's association with the "rebellious Asian girl" stereotype; the streak was removed from existing footage in post-production with visual effects. For the role, Zhang trained in MMA, tai chi, and rope dart. Elodie Fong and Harmonie He portray Xialing as a child and teenager, respectively. 
 Fala Chen as Ying Li: Wenwu's wife and the mother of Shang-Chi and Xialing who was a guardian of Ta Lo. Chen studied tai chi for the role.
 Florian Munteanu as Razor Fist: A member of the Ten Rings who has a machete blade for his right hand.
 Benedict Wong as Wong: A Master of the Mystic Arts participating in a cage fighting tournament with Emil Blonsky.
 Yuen Wah as Guang Bo: One of the leaders of Ta Lo.
 Michelle Yeoh as Ying Nan: A guardian of Ta Lo who is Shang-Chi and Xialing's aunt. Yeoh previously portrayed Aleta Ogord in the MCU film Guardians of the Galaxy Vol. 2 (2017).
 Ben Kingsley as Trevor Slattery:An actor who previously took on the guise of the Mandarin and was abducted by the Ten Rings, becoming a "court jester" or Shakespearean fool for Wenwu. He has a close relationship with the mythical hundun Morris, and journeys to Ta Lo with Shang-Chi. Cretton felt it was "essential to hear [Slattery] admit how ridiculous that whole [Mandarin impersonation] situation was", as seen in Iron Man 3 (2013) and the Marvel One-Shot short film All Hail the King (2014), feeling that having Slattery apologize for impersonating Wenwu was the perfect way to apologize for the racial stereotypes surrounding the Mandarin. Kingsley enjoyed revisiting and developing the character, with Cretton saying Kingsley was able to portray "a Trevor who has actually benefited from being in prison and has come out a clean and sober version of himself".
 Tony Leung as Xu Wenwu:Shang-Chi and Xialing's father and the leader of the Ten Rings. Wenwu is an original character for the Marvel Cinematic Universe (MCU) who replaces Shang-Chi's original comic book father Fu Manchu, a "problematic character" associated with racist stereotypes to whom Marvel Studios does not hold the film rights. In the film, Wenwu has taken on many different names, including "The Mandarin", which producer Jonathan Schwartz noted comes with audience expectations due to the comic book history of that name. He said Wenwu was a more complex and layered character than the comic book version, with Cretton adding that there were problematic aspects of the Mandarin's comic book portrayal that he wanted to change. He felt Leung avoided Asian stereotypes and a one-dimensional portrayal by bringing humanity and love to the role, describing Wenwu as a "fully realized human" with relatable reasons for his bad decisions. Leung did not want to approach the character as a villain, instead hoping to explore the reasons behind why he is "a man with history, who craves to be loved", describing him as "a sociopath, a narcissist, [and] a bigot".

Also appearing in the film are Ronny Chieng as Jon Jon, Xialing's right-hand man and announcer at her underground fighting club; Jodi Long as Mrs. Chen, Katy's mother; Dallas Liu as Ruihua, Katy's brother; Paul He as Chancellor Hui; Tsai Chin as Katy's grandmother; Andy Le as Death Dealer, one of Wenwu's assassins who trained Shang-Chi in his youth; Stephanie Hsu and Kunal Dudheker as Soo and John, married friends of Shang-Chi and Katy; Zach Cherry as Klev, a bus rider who livestreams one of Shang-Chi's fights (after portraying a street vendor in 2017's Spider-Man: Homecoming); and Dee Baker as the voice of Morris, a hundun who befriends Slattery. Jade Xu reprises her role as a Black Widow named Helen from Black Widow (2021), while Tim Roth provides uncredited vocals for his The Incredible Hulk (2008) character Emil Blonsky / Abomination. Mark Ruffalo and Brie Larson appear uncredited in the mid-credits scene as Bruce Banner and Carol Danvers / Captain Marvel, respectively, reprising their MCU roles.

Production

Development 
According to Margaret Loesch, former president and CEO of Marvel Productions, Stan Lee discussed a potential film or television series based on the Marvel Comics character Shang-Chi with actor Brandon Lee and his mother Linda Lee during the 1980s, with the intention of having Brandon Lee star as the character. Brandon's father, martial arts legend Bruce Lee, was the visual inspiration for artist Paul Gulacy when drawing Shang-Chi during his tenure on the Master of Kung Fu comic book series in the 1970s. In 2001, Stephen Norrington signed a deal to direct a Shang-Chi film entitled The Hands of Shang-Chi. By 2003, the film was in development at DreamWorks Pictures with Yuen Woo-Ping replacing Norrington as director and Bruce C. McKenna hired to write the screenplay. Ang Lee joined the project as a producer in 2004, but the film did not materialize after that point and the rights to the character reverted to Marvel. In September 2005, Marvel chairman and CEO Avi Arad announced Shang-Chi as one of ten properties being developed as films by the newly formed Marvel Studios, after the company received financing to produce the slate of ten films which were to be distributed by Paramount Pictures. Shang-Chi was put on a list of characters that Marvel thought could make great films despite being relatively unknown, since he had a "very Disney story" in the comic books.

The Ten Rings were featured in the first Marvel Cinematic Universe (MCU) film, Iron Man (2008), without their leader the Mandarin. Marvel Studios then planned to feature the Mandarin in a film that could do the character "supreme justice" and showcase his complexity, which Marvel Studios President Kevin Feige felt they could not do in the Iron Man films because those focused on Tony Stark / Iron Man. According to Chris Fenton, former president of the Chinese-based film production company DMG Entertainment that was in talks with Marvel Studios to co-produce their films, Marvel offered to create a teaser featuring either Shang-Chi or the Mandarin for the Chinese market that would be featured at the end of The Avengers (2012). DMG balked at the offer, since the Mandarin's negative stereotypical portrayal in the comics could potentially prevent the film from releasing in China and risk shutting down DMG as a company. The Mandarin would eventually appear in the DMG co-produced film Iron Man 3 (2013) portrayed by Ben Kingsley, but he is revealed to be imposter Trevor Slattery posing as the Mandarin. Feige felt this fake Mandarin did not necessarily mean that a more faithful version of the character did not exist in the MCU.

By December 2018, Marvel had fast-tracked development of a Shang-Chi film with the intent of making it their first film with an Asian lead. Marvel hired Chinese-American writer Dave Callaham to write the screenplay, and began looking at Asian and Asian-American filmmakers to potentially direct the film. The studios' goal was to explore Asian and Asian-American themes presented by Asian and Asian-American filmmakers, as they had done for African and African-American culture with Black Panther earlier in 2018. Development of the film also came following the success of the film Crazy Rich Asians that was likewise released earlier in 2018 and led to several other Asian-led properties being developed by Hollywood studios. Callaham's script was expected to modernize elements of the character's comic book story, which was first written in the 1970s, to avoid what modern audiences would consider to be negative stereotypes. When Callaham began work on the script, he became emotional realizing it was the first project where he was asked to write "from my own experience, from my own perspective". Jessica Gao, who would later become the head writer of the TV series She-Hulk: Attorney at Law (2022), had also presented a pitch for the film. Richard Newby of The Hollywood Reporter said the film could "break out in a way similar to Black Panther" by bringing a new perspective to the character. Newby felt Shang-Chi could have worked well as a television series, and said it "speaks volumes" that Marvel would decide to make a feature film about the character instead. Newby concluded that the film was an opportunity to avoid stereotypes about Asian martial artists and be "more than Marvel's Bruce Lee".

Marvel Studios hired Japanese-American filmmaker Destin Daniel Cretton to direct the film in March 2019. Deborah Chow—who previously directed episodes of Marvel Television's Iron Fist and Jessica Jones series—Justin Tipping, and Alan Yang were also considered. Cretton admitted that he had previously not been interested in directing a superhero film, but was drawn to the project to help create a world and character that Asian children could look up to and see themselves in. Cretton's pitch for the film included visual inspiration from Chinese, South Korean, Japanese, and other Asian cinema, including anime, to highlight a tone that showed "the drama and the pain of life, but also show[ed] the humor of life". In April, Marvel Studios and Australian Arts Minister Mitch Fifield announced that an upcoming Marvel film, believed to be Shang-Chi, would be filmed at Fox Studios Australia in Sydney and on location throughout the state of New South Wales. The production received AU$24 million (US$ million) in one-off funding from the Australian government, as well as backing from the AU$10 million (US$ million) "Made in NSW" state fund. The production was expected to generate AU$150 million (US$ million) for the Australian economy as well as 4,700 new jobs, while taking advantage of around 1,200 local businesses. Don Harwin, the New South Wales Arts Minister, confirmed in July that this film was Shang-Chi and that it would be produced back-to-back with Marvel Studios' Thor: Love and Thunder (2022); production on Shang-Chi was set to be completed before work began on Love and Thunder later in 2020.

Pre-production 
In mid-July 2019, Marvel Studios began testing actors in their 20s for the role of Shang-Chi, including Lewis Tan and Simu Liu; Tan previously portrayed Zhou Cheng in Iron Fist. The studio was adamant that actors be of Chinese descent to audition for the character. Liu was considered earlier in the audition process and was brought back in for a second audition when the creatives were finding it difficult to cast the role. He tested again for the part on July 14 and was officially cast on July 16. Awkwafina, who was the first actor cast for the film, had chemistry tests with the potential actors and said "it was apparent that [Liu] was Shang-Chi from the jump". Liu and Awkwafina's castings were announced by Cretton and producer Feige at Marvel Studios' San Diego Comic-Con panel on July 20, where the film's full title was announced to be Shang-Chi and the Legend of the Ten Rings. Feige noted the Ten Rings organization's role throughout the MCU, and said the Mandarin would be introduced in this film with Tony Leung in the role.

The Ten Rings logo was changed for the film from including Mongolian language in previous MCU appearances to having "inoffensive" Chinese characters that are synonyms for strength or power written in ancient seal script. This was done following the logo's appearance in Iron Man 3, which drew ire from the Mongolian government who felt the Mongolian scripts "offensively tied the country's intangible cultural heritage to a terrorist group", though Oyungerel Tsedevdamba, Mongolia's former minister of culture, sports and tourism, believed the change was more to appease the Chinese market. Kingsley reprises his role as Slattery in Shang-Chi and the Legend of the Ten Rings, with the character's inclusion planned early on in order to help fully explore the "context of who the Mandarin is in the MCU". Producer Jonathan Schwartz called Slattery a "secret weapon" whose introduction part-way through the film moves it in a different direction and provides comic relief. Cretton said in October that production would begin in early 2020. In December, Feige said the film would feature a predominantly Asian cast. A month later, Michelle Yeoh entered talks for a role in the film. This was for a different character than Aleta Ogord, who Yeoh had briefly portrayed in Marvel's Guardians of the Galaxy Vol. 2 (2017). Jessica Henwick, who previously portrayed Colleen Wing in Iron Fist, was offered by Disney to audition for the role of Xialing in the film, but was concurrently offered by Warner Bros. the role of Bugs in The Matrix Resurrections (2021); after Disney and Warner gave her an ultimatum over which role to select with the condition of rejecting the other, Henwick chose the Resurrections part over Shang-Chi, in part because she wanted to reprise the role of Wing in a future MCU production.

In addition to Callaham, Cretton and Andrew Lanham also contributed to the screenplay for Shang-Chi and the Legend of the Ten Rings from a story by Callaham and Cretton. The film was described as a "sweeping superhero epic that combines emotional family drama with gravity-defying martial arts action". Schwartz said much of Shang-Chi's arc within Marvel Comics is a family drama, and Cretton wanted to focus on that element for the film, exploring Shang-Chi's broken and abusive family background. Liu noted that the comic book backstory for Shang-Chi is not widely known like those for comic book characters such as Batman or Spider-Man, and that gave the film's writers freedom to take more creative liberties with the story. Cretton and Callaham were cognizant of some of the racial stereotypes surrounding the character in the comics, with Liu saying everyone involved was "very sensitive to not have it go into stereotypical territory". Cretton believed the resulting script was a "really beautiful update" to the character from what began in the comics.

Cretton felt the film told an authentic story about Asian identity. Callaham said there is "no single Asian American voice", and he and Cretton contemplated how the film could speak to "the wider Asian diaspora" and would be generally entertaining but also "personal to all these people". Cast members Liu, Leung, and Meng'er Zhang contributed their own experiences coming from Canada, Hong Kong, and mainland China, respectively, to add to the authenticity of the film. Some aspects that were discussed regarding each scene were whether characters should be speaking in Chinese Mandarin or English and the type of food served in the different households to ensure it felt authentic to whose house it was. The film's opening begins with narration entirely in Mandarin, which Nancy Wang Yuen, writing for io9, said was a striking decision for an MCU film to "begin in a language other than English and continue to do so for an extended period". Regarding the use of Mandarin in the film, Cretton said the choice of which language to use when was "always rooted in just the logic of the characters and who would naturally be speaking what language". Zhang, whose first language is Mandarin, served as a dialect coach for the other actors. Shang-Chi and the Legend of the Ten Rings further deals with Asian language and some negative characterization around it by portraying its characters as having varied knowledge of Asian languages, as demonstrated by an exchange with Katy and Jon Jon when Jon Jon says he speaks "ABC" (American-born Chinese), and Shang-Chi teaching Katy how to pronounce his name, which serves as a meta moment to also aid the audience on the proper pronunciation of "Shang-Chi".

Having Shang-Chi surrounded by "many strong women" formed out of the relationship between Shang-Chi and Wenwu, with them being supporting characters to him while also being on their own narrative arcs. Cretton stated that having "women who are kind of kicking his butt into gear throughout the movie just felt right". Cretton's three sisters and his wife helped inspire Katy, Xialing, Ying Nan, and Ying Li. Speaking to the relationship between Shang-Chi and Katy, Cretton enjoyed being able to show a strong, "deeply caring" friendship that is rarely seen in superhero films, adding that it never felt right to have the two characters end up in a romantic relationship since it would have been forced. Yeoh requested a scene be added between her character Ying Nan and Zhang's Xialing that would empower Xialing to "step out of the shadows for the first time"; this scene became an important part of Xialing's journey in the film and was one of the many scenes that also addressed the sexism presented in the story. Cretton felt seeing Xialing become the new head of the Ten Rings organization in the film's post-credits scene was reflective of her beginning to take control of her life. Various versions of the scene existed throughout the production before it was moved to be after the credits since they thought it was "a juicy idea for where the story might go in the future". Cretton also noted there was more material created regarding the ten rings that was purposely withheld to be explored in future projects.

Filming 
Principal photography began in February 2020, shooting at Fox Studios Australia in Sydney and on location throughout the state of New South Wales, under the working title Steamboat. William Pope served as cinematographer for the film, shooting on the Arri Alexa LF. Cretton chose Pope because he felt the cinematographer's style could be both naturalistic and heightened, and because of Pope's work on The Matrix (1999) which Cretton believed had the right tone for an MCU film focused on Asian and Asian-American characters. Cretton was inspired by Jackie Chan's filmography, the Ip Man series, Tai Chi Master, and Kung Fu Hustle among others in the martial arts and kung-fu genres, as well as anime and video games.

On March 12, after studios had started halting production on films due to the COVID-19 pandemic, Cretton decided to have himself tested for coronavirus after working closely with people who had potentially been exposed to it. This was a precaution due to Cretton having a newborn baby, and he self-isolated while awaiting these results; the test later came back negative. While Cretton was self-isolating, Marvel suspended first unit production for the film but intended for other aspects such as second unit to continue as normal. On March 13, the rest of the film's production was paused as Disney halted filming on most of its projects. Before the shut down, Ronny Chieng joined the cast in an undisclosed role. In early April, Disney shifted much of their Phase Four slate of films due to the pandemic, moving Shang-Chi release date to May 7, 2021.

Work building sets for the film resumed at the end of July 2020, and by August 2, all cast and crew members had arrived to begin shooting "in the coming days". Any cast and crew members returning to Australia from outside the country had to be quarantined for two weeks upon arrival before returning to work, according to Australia's guidelines. Later in August, Yeoh was confirmed to appear in the film. The next month, the film's release date was pushed back to July 9, 2021, after Black Widow was shifted to the May 2021 date. In October, filming took place in San Francisco, also under the working title Steamboat. Shooting locations included the Russian Hill, Noe Valley, and Nob Hill neighborhoods, as well as Fisherman's Wharf and Ghirardelli Square. Filming wrapped on October 24, 2020.

For the film's action scenes, Cretton drew inspiration from a range of different fighting styles due to Shang-Chi being trained in different types of martial arts. These include the "elegant, almost ethereal wushu style" from Crouching Tiger, Hidden Dragon (2000) and the "kinetic" fights of Jackie Chan's films. Supervising stunt coordinator Brad Allan along with other members of the Jackie Chan Stunt Team became responsible for making the different styles feel consistent, as well as containing elements of Hong Kong action cinema. Chinese choreographers were used to create wuxia-style fight scenes. Schwartz said there was a meaning for each fighting style in the film, and they helped to tell the story visually. The bus fight sequence was part of Cretton's pitch for the film, calling it a "what-if scenario" to help explain the fight sequences he enjoyed, "ones where the stakes just keep rising as the fight continues". Once it was planned for the film, Cretton credited Allan for bringing the "Buster Keaton-like physical comedy [to the fight], mixed with setups and payoffs, and stakes rising and rising to almost ridiculous levels". Fight coordinator Andy Cheng added that the bus fight took over a year to plan, going through as many as 20 different iterations, with most of the differences pertaining to the fighting within the bus. The sequence was partially completed when the production shut down for COVID, requiring those involved to "retune" once production resumed to complete it. Cheng added that figuring out how the bus would be sliced in half and choreographing a fight around it was the most difficult part. Although the exterior shots of the sequence were filmed in San Francisco, the bus interior scenes were shot in Sydney. The sequence was shot in 48 fps to help with tracking or adjustments, and converted back to 24 fps, while the shots in slow-motion were shot at 250 fps using a Phantom Camera. The Kamehameha attack from the anime Dragon Ball Z was an inspiration for the final fight between Shang-Chi and Wenwu, which Cretton had also included in his pitch.

Post-production 

Shang-Chi and the Legend of the Ten Rings is dedicated to supervising stunt coordinator Brad Allan, who died in August 2021. Nat Sanders and Elísabet Ronaldsdóttir served as co-editors on the film, alongside Harry Yoon. In December 2020, Marvel revealed roles for several cast members, including Awkwafina as Shang-Chi's friend Katy, Yeoh as Jiang Nan, and Chieng as Jon Jon. They also announced the casting of Meng'er Zhang as Xialing, Fala Chen as Jiang Li, and Florian Munteanu as Razor Fist; Munteanu was cast after Marvel Studios was impressed with his role in Creed II (2018). In March 2021, the film's release date was pushed back once again to September 3, 2021, when Black Widow was shifted to the July 2021 date, and Dallas Liu was revealed to be appearing.

The film's official trailer in June 2021 revealed that Benedict Wong would reprise his MCU role of Wong, along with the appearance of the Abomination; the Abomination first appeared in The Incredible Hulk (2008), portrayed by Tim Roth, with Roth providing uncredited vocals for the character in Shang-Chi and the Legend of the Ten Rings. Feige enjoyed returning to the Abomination after over a decade since his last MCU appearance, especially with the fans recognizing and embracing the reference. Cretton added that, beyond being a pairing that "felt really great", the Abomination and Wong were chosen because they "made sense to what's happening in the MCU around the time of our movie" and linked it to future MCU projects. Both characters appear in She-Hulk: Attorney at Law, and because of Gao creating a substantial storyline for Abomination in the series, he was added to Shang-Chi as a way "to seed him so that people can get excited but also remember him". Wong was thrilled to be part of the film and its Asian cast, expressing excitement to be "sat at a table of Asian excellence".

The film's mid-credits scene, which features Mark Ruffalo as Bruce Banner and Brie Larson as Carol Danvers, was conceived late in the film's production by Cretton to address the origins of the ten rings. Callaham noted that there were many different origins created in the film for the ten rings, before it was decided to leave the origins ambiguous to be addressed in more detail in a later MCU property. Callaham said this was an intentional choice after they realized "it doesn't make any difference at all where it comes from [in this film]. That's not the story we're telling." Cretton had hoped the scene would feature Wong, as well as him going to karaoke with Shang-Chi and Katy to sing "Hotel California", but was unsure which additional Avengers characters would appear until late in post-production. Banner and Danvers were both chosen for the scene since they each represent the science and space aspects of the MCU, respectively, with their appearances also lining up accurately with other events in the MCU happening around the time of the scene. Additionally, Callaham believed Larson was added because she previously worked with Cretton on Short Term 12 (2013), The Glass Castle (2017), and Just Mercy (2019). Though Cretton reiterated that Danvers' appearance made sense for the scene, he jokingly acknowledged that this continued the streak of her appearing in his films and said that he enjoys including "people that I love in the movies that I'm making". Ruffalo and Larson filmed their roles in early 2021 during the film's additional photography. Feige said the scene was meant to indicate "how vital and important" Shang-Chi was to the MCU, likening it to Nick Fury's appearance in the post-credits scene of Iron Man.

Visual effects 
Sixteen visual effects vendors worked on the film, with up to three vendors on a given shot, creating over 2,000 shots, of which over 1,700 were in the final film. Visual effects supervisor Joe Farrell described the process like "moving chess pieces around". 40 to 50 of the 168 shots in the bus fight sequence were mostly digital, with the entire environment requiring digital pieces including the bus, buildings, and people. Farrell stated the motion of the sequence made editing difficult, especially in regards to the nine passengers. They were mapped out to know where they were at all times and sometimes were digitally moved around. Farrell, who had to remain in Sydney due to the COVID pandemic, planned the San Francisco shoot using Google Street View and hired crew members who had worked on the Fast & Furious franchise to film the sequence. Because the fight sequence in Macau takes place on scaffolding outside of a glass building, crews built an expansive 360-degree blue screen around the set in order to prevent the crew's reflection from appearing on film, with Rodeo FX doing the rotoscoping work necessary for the sequence. Much of downtown Macau was created digitally, with Farrell remotely supervising the sequence from Sydney after having drone crews map out the area on Google Earth. Rising Sun Pictures contributed to over 300 VFX shots in the film and was primarily responsible for creating the digital environment for Ta Lo. Artists of the company created the geography of the forest, and took inspiration from locations in Southeast Asia and also integrated some practical elements from material shot in Sydney, which was later adjusted for proper lighting in post. Sets for Ta Lo were carefully designed in order to allow for the easier combination between practical and CG elements, such as adding in erosion to various trees and also adding more water and species of trees and other plants to the shots. The team also worked with the Australian Institute for Machine Learning in order to develop an advanced technique for facial replacement, powered by artificial intelligence (AI), which was used to replace the stunt double's faces with the principal actors for the action scenes located in the area.

The water map scene went through many iterations to determine how that information should be conveyed, with Cretton feeling the use of water "perfectly connected to the story of our characters" and created a "visually beautiful scene". The hundun Morris was inspired by Cretton's family dog, a 15-year-old dachshund. Images of hunduns were included during early development as potential inspiration for the film and Cretton wanted to feature one in the film in some way after seeing them. Morris was a green screen "blob" during filming, with Cretton crediting Kingsley for helping to "breathe life into him", making it feel as if Morris was a real character. Multiple different designs were tested for the character, including one that had him looking "like a plucked chicken", but the creatives wanted to ensure Morris remained cute, which was challenging since a character's eyes and face help convey their emotion. As such, they relied on the look of his fur and feathers. WetaFX contributed to over 305 VFX shots in the film. The team found creating the CG rings easy, but they had difficulty in designing its movement, as the ring's movements were very "character-specific"; Shang-Chi used the rings defensively while Wenwu used them in an aggressive manner. They also created the designs of the Great Protector and the Dweller-in-Darkness for the film and helped create the action scenes between them featuring the water. The creatures were rendered using various tools, such as Houdini and Mantra, and animated using other tools such as the Maya and Loki puppets. Proxy versions of the creatures are created at first, and then the visualization for the chakras, with different colors, and the human souls was added. Then, the team used the real-time renderer Gazebo to assess the newly created model, which allows them to identify any potential problems early on. After this, the team inserted the hair of the dragons, and the texture artists added shading to the dragons to give them "material properties". Real-life materials, such as quartz, shells, lizard skin, and elephant hides, were used as references. In creating the water, the team used production line techniques, as they designated individuals in supervising certain parts of the water simulation, such as the water surface. The film's main-on-end title sequence was designed by Perception, and focused on the movement of water.

Music 

Recording for the film's score, composed by Joel P. West, began at Abbey Road Studios in London by June 2021. West scored Cretton's four previous films. The film's score was released digitally by Marvel Music and Hollywood Records on September 1, 2021.

Marvel Music, Hollywood Records, and Interscope Records also released four separate singles ahead of the film's release: "Lazy Susan" by 21 Savage and Rich Brian, "Every Summertime" by Niki, "Run It" by DJ Snake, Rick Ross, and Rich Brian, and "In the Dark" by Swae Lee & Jhené Aiko. A soundtrack album containing these songs was released on September 3, in addition to songs by JJ Lin, Saweetie, Anderson .Paak, and other artists and was produced by Sean Miyashiro and 88rising.

Marketing 
On April 19, 2021, Liu's birthday, he shared the first teaser poster for the film, shortly followed by Marvel releasing the first teaser trailer. Adam B. Vary of Variety felt it was "gratifying to finally see Liu in action as Shang-Chi" and highlighted how the teaser provided further insight and new information for the film, such as the way it would depict the rings worn by the Mandarin. Cole Delbyck at HuffPost said the "eye-popping" action was unlike anything seen in past MCU films. Writing for io9, Rob Bricken felt the teaser did not disappoint with its action, but the family drama was what made the film look compelling to him. Collider Adam Chitwood called the teaser "pretty fantastic", comparing its story and tone to Black Panther, and saying Shang-Chi looked to be "an exciting, fresh, and new Marvel Cinematic Universe experience" based on the teaser. Reactions to the poster and trailer in Chinese speaking regions in East Asia were more critical, with commentators believing both presented a "rather stereotyped" view of Chinese people and culture.

The film's first full trailer was released on June 24, 2021, during ESPN's NBA Countdown. Sean Keane at CNET enjoyed seeing more of Leung in the trailer and called the fight sequences "super-impressive". He was surprised by the inclusion of Abomination at the end of the trailer and noted that the character looked more like his design from the comics than when he appeared in The Incredible Hulk. Digital Spy Gabriella Geisinger felt the Abomination's role in the film would just be a cameo appearance to set up the character's story in the Disney+ series She-Hulk: Attorney at Law (2022) but also felt it could still have "wide-reaching implications" for the MCU. Germain Lussier of io9, Susana Polo of Polygon, and Jennifer Ouellette of Ars Technica all felt the trailer was a better showcase for Shang-Chi than the teaser was, with Ouellette highlighting the different narration for the trailer that expanded on Shang-Chi's family background. Lussier also noted that the trailer featured a lot of new visual effects that were not in the teaser, and felt that Shang-Chi would soon become a "huge star", despite not being a well-known character, similarly to Iron Man before Iron Man. Polo highlighted the martial arts and magic seen in the trailer. An episode of the series Marvel Studios: Legends was released on September 1, exploring the Ten Rings organization using footage from its previous MCU appearances.

On August 15, 2021, Ron Han created a GoFundMe drive to raise money for Asian American Pacific Islander (API) children at the Boys & Girls Club in San Gabriel Valley to see Shang-Chi and the Legend of the Ten Rings, as well as the larger "Shang-Chi challenge" for other people to create similar drives for their communities; the challenge was inspired by a similar one created for Black Panther. By the end of the month, API nonprofit organization Gold House partnered with GoFundMe to create the Shang-Chi and the Legend of the Ten Rings Gold Open Community Fund to raise money for private screenings of the film for the API community and non-profit groups on its opening weekend to help the film earn a successful opening weekend box office gross. Beginning September 3, Shang-Chi and Death Dealer began appearing in Disneyland's Avengers Campus.

Promotional partners for the film included Sanzo beverages, which released a limited edition version of lychee flavor; Microsoft; BMW, which acted as the film's global car sponsor and had the BMW iX3 and BMW M8 appear in the film; Old Spice; and international sponsors including Visa, Virgin Plus, Gruppo TIM, Mikron Group, and BGF.

Release

Theatrical 
Shang-Chi and the Legend of the Ten Rings had its world premiere at the El Capitan Theatre and TCL Chinese Theatre in Los Angeles on August 16, 2021, and was screened at CinemaCon on August 25. The film began releasing in international markets on September 1, with it releasing in 66% of its markets by the end of its first weekend. In Australia, Shang-Chi and the Legend of the Ten Rings was released on September 2, with a planned release in New South Wales, Victoria, and Australian Capital Territory on September 16 because of the COVID-19-related state lockdowns; it ultimately released in New South Wales on October 11 when theaters in the state reopened. It was released in the United States on September 3, in over 4,200 theaters, with 400 IMAX, over 850 in premium large format, 1,500 3D, and 275 in specialty D-Box, 4DX, and ScreenX.

The film had a 45-day exclusive theatrical release, rather than being released simultaneously in theaters and on Disney+ with Premier Access like Black Widow. In August 2021, with the increase of COVID-19 Delta variant cases, Disney CEO Bob Chapek explained that the film would stay theatrical-only due to "the practicality of last-minute changes" and called the 45-day exclusivity "an interesting experiment" for the company to learn more on how consumers wished to view and consume their films; Liu took issue with Chapek calling the film an experiment, with Feige later stating Liu's response appeared to be a misunderstanding on Chapek's intention. Shang-Chi and the Legend of the Ten Rings is part of Phase Four of the MCU.

Shang-Chi and the Legend of the Ten Rings was previously scheduled to be released on February 12, 2021, the first day of the Chinese New Year, before it was shifted to May 7, and then to July 9, delayed due to the COVID-19 pandemic. The film shifted once again in March 2021 to the September 2021 date after Black Widow was moved to the July 9 release date. In May 2021, a Chinese state media report excluded Shang-Chi and the Legend of the Ten Rings, as well as Eternals, from its list of upcoming MCU films releasing, which Variety noted "added to rumors" that the films would not be released in China. In September 2021, Deadline Hollywood reported that a theatrical release in China was unlikely due to comments Liu made in an interview with the CBC in 2017, referencing negative comments from his parents about living in China. Despite this, by early October Disney still listed the film's release in China as "to be determined".

Home media 
The film was released on digital download on November 12, 2021, as well as on Disney+ as part of the service's "Disney+ Day" celebration. Disney+ also received the IMAX Enhanced version of the film. It was released on Ultra HD Blu-ray, Blu-ray, and DVD on November 30. The home media of the film includes audio commentary, deleted scenes, a gag reel, and various behind-the-scenes featurettes.

Following the release of Shang-Chi and the Legend of the Ten Rings on Disney+, viewer tracking application Samba TV reported that over 1.7 million U.S. households watched the film within its first weekend of availability. Samba TV also disclosed viewerships for the United Kingdom (250,000), Germany (85,000), and Australia (17,000), while TV Time reported that it was the most-streamed film in the United States during that same time frame. Nielsen stated that it was the second-most-streamed film with a viewership of 1.072billion minutes in its first week. Asian Americans made up 10% of the audience, the highest percentage for any title on the chart.

In the second week, it was the third-most-streamed film according to Nielsen, with 878 million minutes viewed, and the second-most-streamed film according to TV Time. It retained its position on TV Time in the following week, while Nielsen stated that it was the third most-streamed-film with 613 million minutes viewed. In the fourth week it dropped to the third position on TV Time's chart, while dropping to the fifth position on Nielsen's chart with a viewership of 273 million minutes. It dropped to the fourth position on TV Time in the following week, while retaining its position on Nielsen with 233 million minutes viewed. In the sixth week it rose to the third position on TV Time's chart. TV Time stated that it was the sixth most-streamed-film globally in 2021.

The film was number one on the NPD Videoscan First Alert chart, which tracks combined sales of DVDs and Blu-rays, and the dedicated Blu-ray sales chart, for two weeks. According to The Numbers, it sold a combined 274,482 DVD and Blu-ray units in the first week for a revenue of $5.2 million. In the second week it sold 143,178 units for $2.7 million. Meanwhile, it also acquired the first position on Redbox's digital chart after release. It was the third most-selling title on disc for December 2021 according to the NPD Group.

Reception

Box office 
Shang-Chi and the Legend of the Ten Rings grossed $224.5million in the United States and Canada, and $207.7million in other territories, for a worldwide total of $432.2million. It became the highest-grossing film ever released on Labor Day weekend, and earned $13.2 million worldwide from IMAX, another Labor Day weekend record.

Shang-Chi and the Legend of the Ten Rings earned $29.6 million on its opening day (which included $8.8 million from its Thursday night previews), the third-best opening day since the start of the COVID-19 pandemic in March 2020. The Thursday night previews gross was the second-highest of the pandemic, behind Black Widow ($13.2 million). It grossed $75.5 million over its three-day opening weekend, the second-largest of the pandemic, behind Black Widow ($80.3 million). IMAX contributed $8 million, which was a record for a Labor Day weekend release. It earned $94.67 million over the four-day Labor Day weekend, surpassing Halloweens (2007) $30.6 million as the largest Labor Day weekend opening ever. The film surpassed $100 million in five days, the fastest film to reach that milestone since Star Wars: The Rise of Skywalker (2019) surpassed that amount in its opening weekend. It remained the number one film in its second weekend, earning $35.8 million, which was the largest second weekend gross of the pandemic. In its third weekend, the film was once again the number one film, earning $21.7 million, becoming the second-largest third weekend gross for a September release behind It (2017). Shang-Chi and the Legend of the Ten Rings was again the top film in its fourth weekend, the third MCU film following Guardians of the Galaxy (2014) and Black Panther (2018) to remain the top film for four consecutive weeks, and became the highest-grossing film of 2021 in the United States, surpassing Black Widow. The film surpassed $200 million in the United States and Canada by September 30, becoming the first film of the pandemic era to achieve the milestone, was the third-highest-grossing film in its fifth weekend, and the fourth-highest in its sixth weekend. It remained in the top ten at the box office for two additional weekends. By its fourth weekend, Deadline Hollywood projected the film would earn $250 million in total domestic box office. It ended its run at the box office as the second highest-grossing film of 2021 in this region behind Spider-Man: No Way Home.

The film earned $56.2 million from 41 markets in its opening weekend, opening number one in many. The United Kingdom had the largest opening day of the pandemic, as well as the largest three-day opening weekend of the pandemic with $7.7 million. In Hong Kong, the film produced the largest September opening weekend, as well as the second-best opening during the pandemic. Nancy Tartaglione of Deadline Hollywood noted South Korea's $6.5 million opening was an underperformance for the market and an MCU film, though it was the first Hollywood film to open at number one in several weeks. In its second weekend, the film earned $35.2 million from 42 markets, remaining number one in several. In its third weekend, the film earned an additional $20.3 million from 43 markets, being the top film in many territories, including Australia, Brazil, Mexico, and the UK. The film opened in Indonesia in its fourth weekend, opening at number one with $1.2 million, while remaining number one in many markets, such as Australia, Brazil, Mexico, and the UK. Shang-Chi and the Legends of the Ten Rings was the top film in Australia for nine weekends, with its highest-grossing day coming on October 31, 2021. , the film's largest markets are the United Kingdom ($27.1 million), South Korea ($14.9 million), and France ($11.5 million).

Critical response 
The review aggregator website Rotten Tomatoes reported an approval rating of 91%, with an average score of 7.5/10, based on 340 reviews. The website's critical consensus reads, "Shang-Chi and the Legend of the Ten Rings isn't entirely free of Marvel's familiar formula, but this exciting origin story expands the MCU in more ways than one." On Metacritic, the film has a weighted average score of 71 out of 100, based on 52 critics, indicating "generally favorable reviews". Audiences polled by CinemaScore gave the film an average grade of "A" on an A+ to F scale, while PostTrak reported 91% of audience members gave it a positive score, with 78% saying they would definitely recommend it.

Peter Debruge at Variety called the film "a flashy, Asian-led visual effects extravaganza that gives the second-tier [Shang-Chi] the same over-the-top treatment that big-timers like Hulk and Thor typically get. The result broadens [Marvel Studios'] spectrum of representation once again, offering audiences of Asian descent the kind of empowerment for which Black Panther paved the way a few years back." Angie Han of The Hollywood Reporter felt while Shang-Chi and the Legend of the Ten Rings did not "meld together" its martial-arts, fantasy elements, and exploration of Chinese and Asian-American culture "as smoothly as [it] should", it did become a superhero film that felt "fresh and fun enough to feel worth a spin". Han believed some of the less intense action sequences made the film seem less like a superhero film and more like "the wistful grandeur of Disney's live-action fairy tale adaptations" and added some of the humor keeps it from "tipping over into self-importance", but "rob[s] it of some of its wonder". She also praised the performance from Leung, whose sincerity in portraying Wenwu made him a "supervillain with a soul".

Giving the film 3.5 out of 4 stars, RogerEbert.coms Nick Allen believed the film "fits into Marvel packaging in its own way, but it has an immense soulfulness that other MCU movies, superhero movies, and action movies in general should take notes from". Allen believed Leung was the film's "most brilliant" casting and enjoyed the various fight sequences since Cretton changed the height, light, reflections, and staging for each. He noted the film's final act was "such an over-the-top, giddy, rollercoaster ride that you can't help but root for it" and concluded that Shang-Chi was "not an experiment for Marvel and Disney" but rather "a promising template for how they can get it right again". Writing for Empire, Laura Sirikul said the film was "a winning blend of Chinese culture mixed with the successful Marvel formula that avoids the typical Asian clichés and stereotypes of accents and bad drivers, while pointedly calling out some of the racial errors from Marvel's past. Given what's on show here, the future for Shang-Chi and Asian representation in the MCU looks bright." Sirikul also felt the choreography was the best yet in the MCU, saying the fight scenes were "truly gratifying" and praised Liu, Awkwafina, and Leung. She did feel, however, the film had some pacing issues that made the story "convoluted" and a "rushed ending [that] makes some of the character arcs feel unearned and brushed aside".

Jake Cole of Slant Magazine was more critical of the film, giving it a score of 1.5 out of 4 stars. He believed Shang-Chi was defined by "the same 'gifted kid' impostor syndrome as so many other self-doubting heroes in the MCU" and criticized Liu's performance as "curiously affectless", but praised Leung as "effortlessly convey[ing] the calm malice with which Wenwu asserts his absolute power as well as the anguish that the man feels over the loss of his wife". Cole felt the film's flashbacks were "superfluous" and had "emotional flatness" that brought the film "to a crawl" each time they were used, and took issue with CGI-aided action scenes and the final act that "devolves into loud and chaotic visual nonsense". Alison Wilmore of Vulture wrote that the film was not "a hopeless addition" to the MCU, but added that it "feels as racked with a sense of inadequacy about its main character as that main character is about himself". She concluded that the film was "caught between the legacy of its forebears and a still-developing sense of self", which was the "most Asian American thing" about the film.

Accolades 
In December 2021, Shang-Chi and the Legend of the Ten Rings received the Vanguard Award at Unforgettable Gala's 19th Annual Asian American Awards, an honor previously held by The Farewell (2019).

Documentary special 

In February 2021, the documentary series Marvel Studios: Assembled was announced. The special on this film, Assembled: The Making of Shang-Chi and the Legend of the Ten Rings, goes behind the scenes of the making of the film, and was released on Disney+ on November 12, 2021.

Sequel 
In December 2021, a sequel was announced to be in development, with Cretton returning to write and direct. The following month, Liu was expected to reprise his role in the sequel, saying that he wanted the film to explore what his character would do with his "newfound power" of the ten rings, as well as how he fits into the larger MCU.

Notes

References

External links 

  at Marvel.com
 

2020s American films
2020s English-language films
2020s fantasy action films
2020s superhero films
2021 3D films
2021 martial arts films
4DX films
Action crossover films
American 3D films
American crossover films
American fantasy action films
American martial arts films
Annie Award winners
Superhero films about Asian Americans
Chinatown, San Francisco in fiction
Films about Chinese Americans
Demons in film
Fantasy crossover films
Film productions suspended due to the COVID-19 pandemic
Films about dragons
Films about families
Films about father–son relationships
Films about grieving
Films about immortality
Films about legendary creatures
Films about siblings
Films directed by Destin Daniel Cretton
Films postponed due to the COVID-19 pandemic
Films scored by Joel P. West
Films set in 1996
Films set in 2024
Films set in Macau
Films set in San Francisco
Films shot in Los Angeles
Films shot in New South Wales
Films shot in San Francisco
Films shot in Sydney
Films with screenplays by Andrew Lanham
Films with screenplays by David Callaham
Films with screenplays by Destin Daniel Cretton
IMAX films
Kung fu films
Martial arts fantasy films
Marvel Cinematic Universe: Phase Four films
 
Superhero crossover films
Underground fighting films
Wuxia films